Self-realization is an term used in western psychology, philosophy, and spirituality; and in eastern Indian religions. In the western understanding, it is the "fulfillment by oneself of the possibilities of one's character or personality" (see also self-actualization). In the Indian understanding, self-realization is liberating knowledge of the true Self, either as the permanent undying Purusha or witness-consciousness, which is atman (essence), or as the absence (sunyata) of such a permanent Self.

Western Understanding
Merriam Webster's dictionary defines self-realization as:

In the Western world "self-realization" has gained great popularity. Influential in this popularity were psycho-analysis, humanistic psychology, the growing acquaintance with Eastern religions, and the growing popularity of Western esotericism.

Psychoanalysis
Though Sigmund Freud was skeptical of religion and esotericism, his theories have had a lasting influence on Western thought and self-understanding. His notion of repressed memories, though based on false assumptions, has become part of mainstream thought. Freud's ideas were further developed by his students and neo-psychoanalysts. Carl Jung, Erik Erikson, and Donald Winnicott have been especially important in the Western understanding of the self, though alternative theories have also been developed by others. Jung developed the notion of individuation, the lifelong process in which the center of psychological life shifts from the ego to the self. Erikson described human development throughout one's lifespan in his theory of psychosocial development. Winnicott developed the notion of the true self. Roberto Assagioli developed his approach of psychosynthesis, an original approach to psychology. Assagioli's original approach is one that is dynamic and continuous, rather than one that can be reached at a "final destination" or completed.

Esotericism
Western esotericism integrates a broad variety of traditions, some of which view self-realization as the ultimate goal of a human being. (See also New Age)

Mysticism defines it as becoming "One" with God or the Absolute.

Religious Associations

Self-Realization is described by St. John of the Cross in his poem the Dark Night of the Soul.

Both Religious Transcendence and Philosophical Transcendence are closely related with self-realization.

Indian Religious Perspective

Jainism
Jain philosophy is one of the oldest world philosophies that separates body (matter) from the soul (consciousness) completely. 
Individual conscience and individual consciousness are central in the Jain philosophy. Self-realization is one of the major pre-requisites to attain ultimate enlightenment and liberation (moksha). Self-realization means peeling away fabricated layers of one's own personality to understand the true self and hence the true nature of reality. In Jainism, karma is portrayed as invisible particles of subtle matter that adhere to a living organism or Jiva. These particles come together to form a film of negativity and darkness around the soul that obscures the true consciousness, making the Jiva lose touch with its original essence as a soul. These karmic particles tend to attract similar particles which cause the inflow of auspicious and inauspicious karmic matter into the soul (Āsrava). This leads the organism to fall into the bondage of lust, worldly pleasures, ego, hatred, jealousy, anger, etc. Thus self-realization paves the way to simply reverse this process and help the seeker to decipher absolute truth on their own. Jainism firmly rejects the belief of a creator, and that one being is solely responsible for his thoughts, actions, and their consequences.

According to Dada Bhagwan:

Hinduism
In Hinduism, self-realization (atma-jnana or atmabodha ) is knowledge of witness-consciousness, the true self which is separate from delusion and identification with mental and material phenomena.

Shaivism
In  Shaivism, self-realization is the direct knowing of the Self God Parashiva. Self-realization (nirvikalpa samadhi, which means "ecstasy without form or seed," or asamprajñata samādhi) is considered the ultimate spiritual attainment.

Self-realization is considered the gateway to moksha, liberation/freedom from rebirth. This state is attained when the Kundalini force pierces through the Sahasrara chakra at the crown of the head. The realization of Self, Parashiva, considered to be each soul's destiny, is attainable through renunciation, sustained meditation and preventing the germination of future karma (the phrase "frying the seeds of karma" is often used)

Advaita Vedanta
Ātman is the first principle in Advaita Vedanta, along with its concept of Brahman, with Atman being the perceptible personal particular and Brahman the inferred unlimited universal, both synonymous and interchangeable. The soteriological goal, in Advaita, is to gain self-knowledge and complete understanding of the identity of Atman and Brahman. Correct knowledge of Atman and Brahman leads dissolution of all dualistic tendencies and to liberation. Moksha is attained by realizing one's true identity as Ātman, and the identity of Atman and Brahman, the complete understanding of one's real nature as Brahman in this life. This is stated by Shankara as follows:

Buddhism

Since Buddhism denies the existence of a separate self, as explicated in the teachings of anatman and sunyata, self-realization is a contradictio in terminis for Buddhism. Though the tathagatagarbha-teachings seem to teach the existence of a separate self, they point to the inherent possibility of attaining awakening, not to the existence of a separate self. The dharmadhatu-teachings make this even more clear: reality is an undivided whole; awakening is the realization of this whole.

Sikhism

Sikhism propounds the philosophy of Self-realization. This is possible by "aatam-cheennea" or "Aap Pashaanae", purifying the self from the false ego:

Guru Nanak says,

See also

 Brahman 
 Enlightenment (spiritual)
 Dark Night of the Soul
 Henosis
 Moksha
 Mysticism
 Nondualism
 Self-discovery
 Consciousness
 Atma bodha
 Self-fulfillment
 Theoria
 Self-realization in Jungian psychology
 Simran

References

Further reading

 
 
 

Mysticism
Religious practices
Self
Spiritual evolution